Clinton County is a county in the U.S. state of Michigan. As of the 2020 Census, the population was 79,128. The county seat is St. Johns. The county was created in 1831 and organized in 1839. It is named after early American politician DeWitt Clinton. Clinton County is included in the Lansing-East Lansing, MI Metropolitan Statistical Area.

Geography

Adjacent counties
 Saginaw County  (northeast)
 Gratiot County  (north)
 Montcalm County  (northwest)
 Shiawassee County  (east)
 Ionia County  (west)
 Ingham County  (southeast)
 Eaton County  (southwest)

Demographics

As of the census of 2000, there were 64,753 people, 23,653 households, and 17,976 families residing in the county. There were 24,630 housing units at an average density of 43 per square mile (17/km2). The racial makeup of the county was 96.40% White, 0.63% Black or African American, 0.44% Native American, 0.52% Asian, 0.04% Pacific Islander, 0.81% from other races, and 1.17% from two or more races.  2.61% of the population were Hispanic or Latino of any race. 35.3% were of German, 11.4% English, 10.1% American and 8.5% Irish ancestry, 96.4% spoke English and 1.9% Spanish as their first language.

There were 23,653 households, out of which 37.40% had children under the age of 18 living with them, 64.30% were married couples living together, 8.40% had a female householder with no husband present, and 24.00% were non-families. 19.80% of all households were made up of individuals, and 7.10% had someone living alone who was 65 years of age or older.  The average household size was 2.70 and the average family size was 3.12.

In the county, the population was spread out, with 28.10% under the age of 18, 7.30% from 18 to 24, 29.20% from 25 to 44, 24.50% from 45 to 64, and 10.90% who were 65 years of age or older.  The median age was 37 years. For every 100 females, there were 98.90 males.  For every 100 females age 18 and over, there were 95.60 males.

The median income for a household in the county was $52,806, and the median income for a family was $60,491. Males had a median income of $42,379 versus $31,065 for females. The per capita income for the county was $22,913.  About 3.30% of families and 4.60% of the population were below the poverty line, including 5.30% of those under age 18 and 6.00% of those age 65 or over.

Transportation

Highways
  travels across southern Clinton County bypassing Lansing on the north. To the south, I-69 continues toward Battle Creek and Fort Wayne, Indiana. Easterly, the highway travels on to Flint and Port Huron.
  is planned to parallel or overlap with US Route 127.
  runs through the southwestern corner of the county before turning southerly to bypass  Lansing. It connects Grand Rapids and Muskegon to the west with Detroit on the east.
  is a business loop running through Lansing and East Lansing. A small portion of the route exists in southeastern Clinton County.
  is a business loop running through Lansing. A small portion of the route exists in southern Clinton County.
  runs north–south through the center portion of the county, serving both St. Johns and DeWitt. US 127 continues northerly toward Mt. Pleasant and Grayling, and southerly past Lansing and on toward Jackson.
  is a loop route through St. Johns.
  passes east–west through Fowler, St. Johns, Shepardsville and Ovid.
  has a short segment in southwestern Clinton County. From a beginning at I-69 in Eaton County, it terminates at I-96 north of Grand Ledge.

Airports
Capital Region International Airport  is a public, Class C airport located 3 miles (5 km) northwest of downtown Lansing, primarily in DeWitt Township.

Abrams Municipal Airport  is a city-owned, public-use airport located two nautical miles (3.7 km) north of the central business district of Grand Ledge, a city in Eaton County.

Government 

The county government operates the jail, maintains rural roads, coordinates local emergency management, operates the major local courts,
keeps files of deeds and mortgages, maintains vital records, administers public health regulations, and
participates with the state in the provision of welfare and other social services. The county
board of commissioners controls the budget but has only limited authority to make laws or ordinances.  In
Michigan, most local government functions — police and fire, building and zoning, tax assessment, street
maintenance, etc. — are the responsibility of individual cities and townships.

Elected officials
 Prosecuting Attorney: Charles D. Sherman
 Sheriff: Sean Dush
 County Clerk/Register of Deeds: Diane Zuker
 County Treasurer: Tina Ward
 Drain Commissioner: Phil Hanses

County Board of Commissioners
7 members, elected from districts (6 Republicans, 1 Democrat)

Communities

Cities
 DeWitt
 East Lansing (part)
 Grand Ledge (part)
 Lansing (part)
 Ovid (part)
 St. Johns (county seat)

Villages
 Eagle
 Elsie
 Fowler
 Hubbardston (part)
 Maple Rapids
 Westphalia

Charter townships
 Bath Charter Township
 DeWitt Charter Township
 Watertown Charter Township

Civil townships

 Bengal Township
 Bingham Township
 Dallas Township
 Duplain Township
 Eagle Township
 Essex Township
 Greenbush Township
 Lebanon Township
 Olive Township
 Ovid Township
 Riley Township
 Victor Township
 Westphalia Township

Census-designated places
 Bath
 Eureka
 Lake Victoria
 Wacousta

Other unincorporated places
 Gunnisonville
 Matherton (part)
 Shepardsville

See also
 List of Michigan State Historic Sites in Clinton County, Michigan
 National Register of Historic Places listings in Clinton County, Michigan
 St. Johns High School (Michigan)

References

External links
 Clinton County government site
 Clinton County Chamber of Commerce
 Clinton County Economic Alliance
 Clinton Conservation District
 

 
Michigan counties
Lansing–East Lansing metropolitan area
1839 establishments in Michigan
Populated places established in 1839